Fort England Psychiatric Hospital is a government-funded psychiatric hospital and drug rehabilitation centre for the Makana Local Municipality area in Makhanda, Eastern Cape in South Africa.

The hospital departments include a Rehabilitation Centre, pharmacy, Anti-Retroviral (ARV) treatment for HIV/AIDS, Post Trauma Counseling Services, Laundry Services, and Kitchen Services.

Coat of arms
The hospital registered a coat of arms at the Bureau of Heraldry in 1975: On a hurt [blue disc], within a double  tressure  Argent [silver],  a  fess  Argent  charged with a chain of nine links Sable [black], the middle link rompu [broken], between in chief an antique lamp enflamed and in base a window Or [gold], set in a wall between two pillars, all Argent.  Mrs. Els designed the arms.

References

Psychiatric hospitals in South Africa
Hospitals in the Eastern Cape
Sarah Baartman District Municipality